Agios Alexios is a neighbourhood in the city of Patras, Achaea, Greece. The name comes from the namesake church of St. Alexius which is located beside Ellinos Stratiotou Street almost 2 km from the city's centre. In a short distance from the church there is a large building which serves as a branch of IKA which is the largest Social Security Organisation in Greece.

Gallery

References

Neighborhoods in Patras